It's the Paris Life (French: C'est la vie parisienne) is a 1954 French comedy film directed by Alfred Rode and starring Claudine Dupuis, Philippe Lemaire and Raymond Bussières. It was shot in Gevacolor. The film portrays the development of Parisian musical culture between 1900 and 1950.

Partial cast
 Claudine Dupuis as Cri-Cri Delagrange / Christine Weston  
 Philippe Lemaire as Paul de Barfleur / Alain de Villebois  
 Raymond Bussières as Anatole Leduc  
 Noël Roquevert as Noël Le Garrec  
 Jean Tissier as M. Weston  
 Maryse Martin as Mlle Machu  
 Arlette Poirier as Emilienne de Montluçon  
 Claude Luter as himself  
 Saturnin Fabre as Comte Gontran de Barfleur  
 Jim Gérald as L'Américain  
 Amédée as Daniel  
 Alfred Rode as Drago  
 Colette Régis as La comtesse  
 Georges Bever as Le maître d'hôtel  
 Françoise Delbart as L'amie  
 Olivier Mathot 
 José Dupuis as Léopold  
 Les Trompes de la Chasse du Dèbuché de Paris as Themselves

References

Bibliography 
 Hayward, Susan. French Costume Drama of the 1950s: Fashioning Politics in Film. Intellect Books, 2010.

External links 
 

1950s historical comedy films
French historical comedy films
1954 films
1950s French-language films
Films directed by Alfred Rode
Films set in Paris
1954 comedy films
1950s French films